Bartolomeo Castelli (1650 – 5 April 1730) was a Roman Catholic prelate who served as Bishop of Mazara del Vallo (1695–1730).

Biography
Bartolomeo Castelli was born in 1650 in Palermo, Italy and ordained a priest in the Congregation of Clerics Regular of the Divine Providence. On 28 November 1695, he was appointed by Pope Innocent XII as Bishop of Mazara del Vallo. On 30 November 1695, he was consecrated bishop by Pier Matteo Petrucci, Cardinal-Priest of San Marcello, with Francesco Gori, Bishop of Catanzaro, and Giovanni Battista Visconti Aicardi, Bishop of Novara, as co-consecrators. He served as Bishop of Mazara del Vallo until his death on 5 April 1730.

Episcopal succession
While bishop, he was the principal co-consecrator of:

References

External links and additional sources
 (for Chronology of Bishops) 
 (for Chronology of Bishops) 

17th-century Roman Catholic bishops in Sicily
18th-century Roman Catholic bishops in Sicily
1650 births
1730 deaths
Bishops appointed by Pope Innocent XII
Clergy from Palermo
Theatine bishops